The Australian Pharmaceutical Formulary (APF) is the national formulary used by pharmacists in Australia, compiled by the Pharmaceutical Society of Australia. New editions of the APF are released every few years, with the latest edition being the 25th.

History
The APF was originally a pocket-sized booklet first published in 1902, used by physicians as a drugs reference in Australia. In later editions, rather than simply being a listing of pharmaceuticals, medical and clinical information became incorporated within the publication as well, and eventually the title of the APF was extended to the Australian Pharmaceutical Formulary and Handbook.

Content
The APF is divided in a number of sections, with each pertaining to a specific topic. Information includes

 Dispensing practice
 Cautionary Advisory Labels (CALs) information and recommendations
 Good compounding practice
 Compounding sterile and hazardous medicines
 Extemporaneous formulary
 Cold chain management
 Clinical drug monographs
 Information on complementary medicines
 Counseling guides for common ailments
 National pharmacy standards and guidelines, and
 Physicochemical data of drug constituents.

See also
Australian Medicines Handbook
British Pharmacopoeia
United States Pharmacopeia
Martindale: The Complete Drug Reference

References

External links
Australian Pharmaceutical Formulary and Handbook, Pharmaceutical Society of Australia

Medical manuals
Pharmacology literature